Madrasa El Maghribia is one of the madrasahs of the medina of Tunis.

Location 

It is located in 44 Tourbet El Bey Street, near four other madrasahs which are: Madrasa Al Husseiniya Al Kubra and Madrasa Al Husseiniya Al Sughra in Sourdou Street, Madrasa Al JasSoussia in Bach Hamba Street and Madrasa Al Habibia Al Sughra in Mtihra Street.

History
The madrasa was built during the Hafsid era.

It was an initiative  of Abou Abdallah Mohamed El Maghrebi who died in 1290. Ibn Khaldoun used to go to this madrasa.

In the beginning it was a teaching place. But by the time, Al-Zaytuna took that role and the madrasa became just a place to host students.
In 1930, it had 12 rooms but 32 students.

References 

Madrasas in the medina of Tunis